Kayqubad III ( or ʿAlāʾ ad-Dīn Kayqubād bin Farāmurz was briefly sultan of the Sultanate of Rum between the years of 1298 and 1302. He was a nephew of the deposed Kaykaus II and had strong support among the Seljuks. As sultan he was a vassal of the Mongols and exercised no real power.

Reign
He first appears circa 1283 as a pretender to the Seljuk throne. He was recognized by the Turkish Karamanids, but he was defeated by vizier Fakhr al-Din Ali and Kaykhusraw III and sought refuge in Cilician Armenia. Nothing is known of his movements again until 1298, when he was appointed to the sultanate by the Ilkhan Mahmud Ghazan upon the downfall of Masud II. He purged the Seljuq administration of his predecessor’s men with extreme violence and became deeply unpopular; as a result when he visited the Ilkhan in 1302, he was executed and replaced with his predecessor Mesud II in order to keep the peace.

Sources

External links

13th-century births
1302 deaths
Sultans of Rum
Executed monarchs
13th-century Turkic people